Rovers is a training program of Scouts Australia for adults aged between 18 and 25 years of age.

Rovers are organised into local Units (formerly known as "Crews") which may be part of or associated with a Scout Group. Rovers are encouraged to become better citizens through training programs, developing leadership skills, participating in outdoor activities, attending national and international events, providing service to the community, and generally building their life skills.

History 
For the history of Rovers see Rover origins.

Rovers began in Australia in late 1918 as young men returned home from World War One and sought outlets with like-minded others. As well as acting as leaders to youth sections, some chose to form Rover Patrols and undertake activities, many service-related, as a team. During the 1920s, these became named Rover Crews. The first Australian Rover is thought to have been Eric Booth from the 1st Chatswood Scout Troop in NSW. After serving in World War One, he was invested in the UK in November 1918 and given the charge to introduce Rover Scouting in Australia. After returning home to 1st Chatswood, he invested Arthur Hindwood, who is believed to be the first Rover invested in Australia.

Baden-Powell's book Rovering to Success was published in 1922 and provided a "book of life-sport for young men", becoming the ethical foundation of the Rover section. The late 1920s saw Rovers adopt the theme of knighthood in their ceremonies and Crew structures.

Uniform
Rovers in Scouts Australia wear its blue uniform shirt with green badges on each shoulder, distinguished by a red shoulder panel as well as the traditional shoulder 'knot' of five ribbons (tan for Joeys, yellow for Cubs, green for Scouts, maroon for Venturers and red for Rovers).

Organisation 

Rovers are organised from a national level down, however the day-to-day running of the section is organised at a Branch (state) level. Victoria, New South Wales and Queensland are split into Regions which in turn are made up of Units. There are around 3,000 Rovers nationally in about 250 Units.

Unlike the other sections of Scouts Australia, Rovers are self-governing with Rovers under 26 becoming the leaders of their own section while still taking part in the program. After the 1970 Design for Tomorrow Report, instead of becoming a new section, Rovers began to admit young women into their Units (known as Crews at the time) and asked their leaders aged over 25 to step back to become Rover Advisers, with the Crew Leaders, Region chairs and Branch chairs taking up the responsibility for their Rovers. The National Rover Council, a group of Rover representatives from each state who co-ordinate interstate efforts, was founded in 1979 and just like Units, all are under 26 years old.

Local Unit 

A local Rover Unit is run by its members and led by an elected committee. The committee normally consists of a Unit Leader, Assistant/Deputy Unit Leader, Secretary and Treasurer and large Units may also add a Fundraiser, Quartermaster, Training Officer, Venturer liaison/Recruitment Officer and other roles. Rovers are young adults and make their own decisions but frequently Units wish to have input and support from people over the age of 25, called Rover Advisers.

Region Rover Council 

The next step in the Rovers organisation ladder is the Region Rover Council. These bodies run Rovering in their geographic areas and are typically based on the same Regions as the other sections of the Scouting Movement. These Regions can also run various Branch events on behalf of the Branch and run their own where all Rovers are invited. The application and practice of Region Rover Councils varies between the three states that operate them, in Victoria this level is known as a Rovering Community and conduct few if any events and are primarily a social networking function with most co-ordination done at a Branch Rover Council level. Conversely in New South Wales, Region Rover Councils generally undertake several Region events a year and support their Units in running events and activities that are open to all Rovers. They operate bank accounts, conduct business and hold an annual report presentation.

There are currently Region Rover Councils in New South Wales, Queensland and Victoria which assist the Units in their region by offering community involvement activities, organising social functions, distributing information, promoting training and the Baden-Powell Award and many other tasks. The smaller states without Region Rover Councils have their Units reporting directly to their Branch Rover Council.

Branch Rover Council 

The Branch Rover Council is composed of representatives from each of the Region Rover Councils (in states that have them) or directly from Units and may also have representatives from sub-committees (for events, property, marketing, motorsport etc.). This body approves Branch awards, co-ordinates training, liaises with other Branch Rover Councils and National Rover Council, develops policies and initiatives and encourages the further development of Rovering and the Rover program.

These bodies also communicate with their respective Branch organisations where the whole state is organised and Branch Rover Councils send their elected members to represent Rover interests. Branch Rover Council's Commissioners and chairs directly represent Rovers to the wider organisation in this way.

Branch Rover Councils also have a number of sub-committees which organise various parts of Rovering life. For example, these may include:
 Management Committees that run campsites and manage assets and property
 Event Committees, which organise some of the larger Rover events in the Branch for Rovers
 Rover Motorsport is CAMS affiliated but also the responsibility of the Branch Rover Council
 Diversity and Inclusion Committees that help support members
 Award approval Committees for the conferring of Rover awards

Some states have a Lone Rover Unit which accepts members from country or other areas where the nearest Rover Unit is further than practical travel allows, or who cannot attend a regular Rover Unit due to work or other commitments. Currently New South Wales, Queensland and South Australia have Lones Units.

National Rover Council 

The Australian National Rover Council (NRC), is the body that governs Rovering at a national Level. It assists the running of Rovering conducted at a Branch level and designs policy to affect Rovering as a whole in Australia. This team works together to develop a strategic plan and then implement this over the course of their elected year/s. They also liaise with the Branch Rover Council Chairs and the Branch Commissioners/Advisers for Rovers (or their equivalent) in each state to help them with any issues, ideas or help that they may need plus implement any actions or policies that affect the whole nation.

The NRC executive is composed of a Chair, Vice Chair, Training and Development Officer, Secretary and delegates from each state plus the Scouts Australia National Team as observers and a representative from New Zealand Rovers. NRC executive members are elected for a one-year term except the Chair that serves a two-year term. Additional project and support officers are elected from time to time. The Council meets as a whole at their annual meeting where each Branch sends a delegation, being their Branch Chair, Branch Commissioner/Adviser (or equivalent) plus two observers, two of these having voting power. 

The National Rover Council Chair is a member of the Scouts Australia National Team and attends National Team and National Operations meetings and through direct participation at the highest level possible puts the "Rovers view" into Scouts Australia, Rovers is the only section with this direct access.

The current Chair of the National Rover Council is Eleanor Hewitt from the ACT.

The NRC meet at the National Rover Council Meeting held annually usually in January following the major event for the year (Jamboree, Venture, or Moot). The Conference runs over three days and incorporates State/Territory reports, discussions and workshops as well as networking activities. The Conference is an excellent opportunity for Branch Rover Council Chairs, their delegates and observers to meet with Rovers from other states and share their knowledge and ideas and learn from one another in a positive environment. It is also an opportunity for States to put forward papers, plans and ideas to the Council to be voted upon so the Chair can then take the resolutions to the National Operations Meeting. The face-to-face format of this meeting is a vital component to national Rover organisation allowing Rovers to form connections that lead to stronger inter-state relationships. it is also when the elections for the years executive take place.

Events

Rovers run an Australian Rover Moot every three years which is open to Rovers, Guides and 18-25 year olds from Scouting organisations around the world. The most recent Australian Rover Moot was held in Canberra, Australian Capital Territory in December 2019/January 2020. The next Australian Rover Moot will be held in Tasmania in December 2022/January 2023.

During 2005 and 2006, the Centenary of Scouting Peace Boomerang completed a journey of over 18,000 km around Australia spreading a message of peace and unity leading up to the Scouting 2007 Centenary.

In 2018 many events and celebrations took place to mark the centenary of the Rover section, nationally this included a uniform badge and the sharing of Rover history with states hosting formal dinner balls, placing time capsules, reunions and countless other local events.

Awards

Baden-Powell Award
The Baden-Powell Award (B-P Award), is the peak award in Rovers. It encourages participation, assistance and leadership, gaining outdoor adventure skills, special interests and undertaking an adventurous journey and a personal development or leadership course. The award certificates are signed in facsimile by the Chief Scout of Australia. Award recipients in states usually receive the award from the state governor, (Northern Territory Rovers may receive theirs from the Territory Administrator and ACT Rovers may receive theirs from the Governor-General) as a part of their Branch's annual or bi-annual awards presentation.

Adult recognition award
The National Rover Service Award is an adult recognition award presented for outstanding contribution of lasting impact to the Rover Section over a sustained period of at least five years' by a Rover and ten years' by a Rover Adviser, leader or other supporter.

In four states, the National Rover Service Award is named to recognise the contribution to Rovering in that state by an early leader:

Motorsport 
Motorsport clubs exist in several states and are the bodies responsible for the safe operation of Rover car racing. They are Confederation of Australian Motorsport-affiliated racing clubs, with strict drink-driving, safety and racing policies. They are operated by an elected and assigned team of Rovers and are under the control of that states Branch Rover Council. They oversee events like Mudbash (VIC),  Sandblast (SA), Banana Bash (QLD), and Bush Baja (WA).

All Rover Motorsport activities were stopped in the early 2000s because of a loss of insurance, but a new affiliation with the Confederation of Australian Motorsport led to the resumption of Rover Motorsport. Victoria successfully ran its inaugural championship series in 2008/2009 and South Australia running its own five round series in 2011, Queensland's Banana Bash has faced similar insurance problems to the point a few year's events were run without actual motorsport racing taking place but as of 2012 vehicles have returned.

Rover property 

Rovers maintain and manage a number of properties. The Victorian Branch Rover Council, through a committee, manages properties built and funded by the Rovers, including two ski lodges and Mafeking Rover Park which are used by Scouts and Rovers, some from other states. During Summer months the Bogong Chalet is maintained and supplied by Rovers, mainly from Victoria. Carr Villa ski lodge on Ben Lomond, Tasmania was built and is owned and funded by a local Rover Crew.

Notable former Australian Rovers 
Dick Smith - recipient of the Baden-Powell Award in 1966.
Shane Jacobson - actor, television presenter, comedian, director and writer
Dave O'Neil - comedian, actor, writer, television and radio presenter and bass player

Notes

External links 
 Rovers Australia – National Rover Council

Scouting and Guiding in Australia
Young adult